Gullo is an Italian surname. Notable people with the surname include:

Dante Gullo (1947–2019), Argentine sociologist and politician
Fausto Gullo (1887–1974), Italian politician

See also
Gulla

Italian-language surnames